Josh Tenge (born December 1978) is a professional sandboarder who has won four world championships and five national titles.

Tenge is a sponsored ( Venomous Sandboards ) professional sandboarding competitor and has set three Guinness World Records, including one for the longest backflip by distance at 44 feet, 10 inches. The record was set on 20 May 2000 in Xwest Huck Fest, Nevada.

References

External links
 CNN article
 List of Sandboarding Events and Competitions

Living people
1978 births
Sandboarding